Tom at Tut's is the third live album from British singer-songwriter Tom McRae.  It was released in 2011 and includes songs and banter from two gigs on consecutive nights – 25 and 26 November 2004 – at King Tut's Wah Wah Hut in Glasgow where McRae performed with a full band. Recorded by Johnny Laing and mixed by Tom McRae. The band consisted of Tom McRae, Oliver Kraus, Olli Cunningham, Ash Soan and Steve Reynolds.

Track listing
 You Only Disappear
 Karaoke Soul
 back at Tut's
 How the West was Won
 if you need a moment
 End of the World News (Dose Me Up)
 that was pretty good
 Hummingbird Song
 São Paulo Rain
 Border Song
 A&B Song
 Human remains
 Silent Boulevard
 Bloodless
 My Vampire Heart
 The Boy with the Bubblegun
 run to the hills
 Language of Fools

References

External links
McRae describes the making of the album in his McRaetheism blog.

2011 live albums
Tom McRae albums